Yelyzaveta Servatynska (born 1997, in Yuzhnoukrainsk, Mykolaiv Oblast, Ukraine) is a Ukrainian photojournalist.

Biography 
She has been taking pictures since her student days.

She graduated from Borys Grinchenko Kyiv Metropolitan University with a degree in journalism. 

She worked as a journalist for the Public Studio program on UA: Pershyi (2020), since 2021, she has been a photojournalist for the Suspilne Novyny news website.

She covers the full-scale Russian invasion of Ukraine in 2022. On April 6, 2022, she visited the liberated Borodianka in the Kyiv region, where she was the first to take a photo of a faith-based locker that was kept on the wall of a destroyed high-rise building. This photo has become a symbol of the invincibility of the Ukrainian people. Ukrainian illustrator Oleksandr Hrekhov used the photo of the locker as the basis for his art, and it was also used by the American magazine Newsweek.

Her work has been published in CNN, Newsweek, Vogue, The Atlantic, and Latin Times.

She is a participant in the collective exhibition War Through the Lens: Photos from Ukraine.

References

External links
 
 

1997 births
Living people
People from Kyiv
War photographers
21st-century Ukrainian people
21st-century photographers
War correspondents of the Russo-Ukrainian War
Ukrainian photographers
Photojournalists
Ukrainian emigrants to Poland
21st-century Ukrainian journalists
Online journalists
Ukrainian women photographers